Elections to Midlothian Council were held in May 1980, the same day as the other Scottish local government elections.

Election results

Ward results

References

1980 Scottish local elections
1980